Lakinsk is a town in Sobinsky District of Vladimir Oblast, Russia, located on the left bank of the Klyazma River,  southwest of Vladimir, the administrative center of the oblast. Population:

History
It grew out of the village of Undol, which was in the same area as the modern town and has been documented since at least the end of the 15th century. In 1889, a spinning-and-weaving factory was opened near the village. As the factory developed, the village also grew. In 1927, Undol was granted work settlement status and renamed Lakinsky after the local party leader. It was granted town status and renamed Lakinsk in 1969.

Administrative and municipal status
Within the framework of administrative divisions, Lakinsk is directly subordinated to Sobinsky District. As a municipal division, the town of Lakinsk is incorporated within Sobinsky Municipal District as Lakinsk Urban Settlement.

Notes

Sources

Cities and towns in Vladimir Oblast
Vladimirsky Uyezd